Kalej  is a village in the administrative district of Gmina Wręczyca Wielka, within Kłobuck County, Silesian Voivodeship, in southern Poland.

The village has a population of 1,668.

References

Kalej